Rožice is a small village southeast of Hrpelje in the Municipality of Hrpelje-Kozina in the Littoral region of Slovenia.

References

External links
Rožice on Geopedia

Populated places in the Municipality of Hrpelje-Kozina